The Metelko alphabet was a Slovene writing system developed by Franc Serafin Metelko. It was used by a small group of authors from 1825 to 1833 but it was never generally accepted.

Metelko introduced his alphabet in the book  (Textbook of the Slovene Language of Kingdom of Illyria and Neighboring Provinces, 1825). He invented his alphabet in order to replace the formerly used Bohorič alphabet, which was considered problematic in certain situations. Metelko was influenced by the ideas of Jernej Kopitar, a well-known linguist who also participated in the development of the modern Serbian alphabet (created by Vuk Karadžić, following Kopitar's ideas).

Metelko's alphabet has 32 letters in the following order:

Special letters are explained in the following table (other letters have the same meaning as in modern Slovene):

The difference between glottal and velar H is in fact not relevant to Slovene phonology, and therefore the letter  was omitted by some authors.

In the formerly used Bohorič alphabet, certain words with different pronunciation had the same spelling. Metelko wanted to solve this problem by splitting E into three and O into two variants.

The main problem of Metelko's alphabet was its graphic design. Metelko's letters appeared strange to the average Slovene writer and the alphabet itself was soon nicknamed krevljica 'the twisted alphabet'. Some letters were in fact difficult to write by hand. Besides Metelko was strongly influenced by his own dialect, certain solutions were not accepted by speakers of other dialects. Soon strong opposition rose against Metelko's alphabet.

After the "Slovene alphabet war" Metelko's alphabet was forbidden in 1833. A few years later Slovenes accepted Gaj's Latin alphabet (Slovene: gajica), which is easier to write. In this alphabet variants in pronunciation are written using diacritics (é, ê, ó, ô, etc.) but only in cases when it is necessary to distinguish two words (e.g. klóp = bench; klôp = tick).

The IETF language tags have assigned the variant  to Slovene in the Metelko alphabet.

See also
Slovene alphabet

References

Sources
Toporišič, Jože. 1993. "Metelčica." Enciklopedija Slovenije, vol. 7, pp. 103–104. Ljubljana: Mladinska knjiga.

External links

Metelčica, text example
Unicode proposal

Slovene alphabet
Writing systems introduced in the 19th century